The Swiss Futsal Championship is the premier  futsal championship in Switzerland.  It was founded in 2004.  The Swiss championship which is played under UEFA rules, currently consists of 16 teams. Organized by Association Suisse de Football.

Champions

External links
futsalplanet.com

Futsal competitions in Switzerland
Football leagues in Switzerland
Switzerland
Sports leagues established in 2004
2004 establishments in Switzerland
Professional sports leagues in Switzerland